Petit Salé  is salted pork, usually produced according to a French method of immersing cuts of pork for up to two days in brine.

Petit Salé is often used as an abbreviation for the recipe Petit Salé aux Lentilles, a dish containing pork, vegetables and lentils.

References

External links
 "Petit salé" with Lentils - The official website of France (English)

Pork
French cuisine
Food preservation